Black Mountain Wilderness is a protected wilderness area to the southwest of the Tiefort Mountains and Fort Irwin in the U.S. state of California.  Established in 1994, the area is managed by the Bureau of Land Management.

The wilderness includes its namesake mesa Black Mountain in the northwestern section of the area, rising to an elevation of 3,941 feet (1201 m) from the Mojave Desert.  Wildlife includes golden eagles and prairie falcons.

See also
List of U.S. Wilderness Areas

References

IUCN Category Ib
Wilderness areas of California
Protected areas of San Bernardino County, California
Protected areas established in 1994
1994 establishments in California